PCBS may refer to:

 Palestinian Central Bureau of Statistics
 PCBs, polychlorinated biphenyls
 Wellington Street bus station (originally Perth Central Bus Station)
 PC Building Simulator

See also
 PCB (disambiguation)